Hemilienardia apiculata is a species of sea snail, a marine gastropod mollusk in the family Raphitomidae.

Description
The length of the shell varies between 3 mm and 8 mm.

The shell is translucent white, with a row of opaque white spots about the middle of the body whorl.

Distribution
This marine species occurs off New Caledonia and off Queensland, Australia

References

 Jousseaume, F.P. 1884. Description de mollusques nouveaux. Bulletin de la Société Zoologique de France 9: 169–192 
 Boettger, O. 1895. Die marinen Mollusken der Philippinen. IV. Die Pleurotomiden. Nachrichtsblatt der Deutschen Malakozooligischen Gesellschaft 27(1-2, 3-4): 1-20, 41-63 
 Powell, A.W.B. 1966. The molluscan families Speightiidae and Turridae, an evaluation of the valid taxa, both Recent and fossil, with list of characteristic species. Bulletin of the Auckland Institute and Museum. Auckland, New Zealand 5: 1–184, pls 1–23 
 Severns, M. (2011). Shells of the Hawaiian Islands - The Sea Shells. Conchbooks, Hackenheim. 564 pp.
 Kay, E.A. 1979. Hawaiian marine shells. Reef and shore fauna of Hawaii. Section 4 : Mollusca. Honolulu, Hawaii : Bishop Museum Press Bernice P. Bishop Museum Special Publication Vol. 64(4) 653 pp.

External links
 
 S.-M. & Montrouzier. (1864). Descriptions d'espèces nouvelles de l'Archipel Calédonien. Journal de Conchyliologie. 12: 261-275, pl. 10
  Hedley, C. 1922. A revision of the Australian Turridae. Records of the Australian Museum 13(6): 213-359, pls 42-56 
 Spencer H.G., Willan R.C., Marshall B.A. & Murray T.J. (2011). Checklist of the Recent Mollusca Recorded from the New Zealand Exclusive Economic Zone
 Gastropods.com: Hemilienardia apiculata apiculata
 MNHN, Paris: syntype

apiculata
Gastropods described in 1864
Gastropods of Australia